Southside Double-Wide: Acoustic Live is the first live album by American rock band Sevendust. It is a live recording of the band's September 12, 2003, performance at the Georgia Theatre in Athens, Georgia. It includes a bonus DVD with the entire album performed live, and also comes in a special cardboard package that includes a set of lithographed pictures of the show.

Track listing

Reception

Chart positions

Personnel

Sevendust
Lajon Witherspoon – lead vocals (1–7 and 9–15)
Clint Lowery – acoustic guitars, co-vocals, lead vocals on "Hurt"
John Connolly – acoustic guitars, backing vocals
Vinnie Hornsby – bass guitar, backing vocals
Morgan Rose – drums, backing vocals

References

Sevendust albums
2004 live albums
TVT Records albums